Salinõmme peninsula is a peninsula in southeastern Hiiumaa, 5 km to south of Suuremõisa, an Estonian territory in the Baltic Sea. It lies in east of Salinõmme Bay and in west of Soonlepa Bay. Village of Salinõmme comprises all of the peninsula. In 1870 the peninsula was still an island.

References

Hiiumaa Parish
Peninsulas of Estonia
Former islands of Estonia
Landforms of Hiiu County